Kamina Air Base  is a military airport located near Kamina in the Democratic Republic of the Congo.

It was built as part of the Belgian near-national-redoubt concept after World War II. It accommodated ONUC military aircraft during the Congo Crisis.

Facilities

See also
 Kamina Airport
 Air Force of the Democratic Republic of the Congo

References

Airports in Haut-Lomami
Military of the Democratic Republic of the Congo
Kamina